Lary Gaby Mehanna (born 28 October 1983) is a Lebanese footballer who plays as a goalkeeper for French club Villeparisis.

Born in Lebanon to a Lebanese father and a French mother, Mehanna moved to France aged one. He was part of the youth team of Paris Saint-Germain, before moving back to Lebanon in 2003, playing for Ansar. After a short stint in France at Tremblay in 2011–12, Mehanna returned to Ansar, before moving to France in 2016, playing for amateur side Villeparisis.

Mehanna has played for Lebanon internationally between 2006 and 2014. He has played over 30 games, representing Lebanon at the 2010 FIFA World Cup qualifiers and the 2011 AFC Asian Cup qualifiers.

Early life 
Born on 28 October 1983 in Beirut, Lebanon, to a Lebanese father and a French mother, Mehanna moved aged one with his family to Dammartin-en-Goële, France, due to the ongoing Lebanese Civil War. Aged six, Mehanna played as a defender for Cergy-Pontoise; he became a goalkeeper aged 12 during a youth tournament. Between 1998 and 2002 Mehanna played for Paris Saint-Germain's youth setup.

Club career 
Mehanna joined Lebanese Premier League side Ansar on 8 July 2003. He retired from football in December 2015, before moving to France in January 2016, joining Regional 3 side Villeparisis in the French eighth division.

International career 
On 16 October 2015, Mehanna announced his international retirement.

Personal life 
On 21 August 2016, Mehanna married Natalie Nasrallah. His favourite club is French side Paris Saint-Germain.

Honours
Ansar
 Lebanese Premier League: 2005–06, 2006–07
 Lebanese FA Cup: 2005–06, 2006–07, 2009–10, 2011–12

Individual
 Lebanese Premier League Best Goalkeeper: 2007–08
 Lebanese Premier League Team of the Season: 2005–06, 2006–07

See also
 List of Lebanon international footballers

References

External links
 
 
 
 

1983 births
Living people
Footballers from Beirut
Footballers from Seine-et-Marne
Lebanese emigrants to France
Lebanese people of French descent
Sportspeople of Lebanese descent
Lebanese footballers
French footballers
Association football goalkeepers
Cergy Pontoise FC players
Paris Saint-Germain F.C. players
Al Ansar FC players
Lebanese Premier League players
Lebanon international footballers